John Boyd (May 1, 1824July 2, 1882) was an Irish American immigrant, politician, and Wisconsin pioneer. He represented northern Fond du Lac County as a member of the Wisconsin State Assembly for four terms.  He later served part of a term in the Kansas House of Representatives, but was unseated due to a dispute over his election.

Biography
John Boyd was born in England on May 1, 1824, and graduated from Trinity College in Dublin, Ireland, in 1843.  He emigrated to the United States with his parents and siblings in 1844.  The Boyd family settled at Calumet, in the Wisconsin Territory.

Boyd became active with the Democratic Party of Wisconsin and was elected to four terms in the Wisconsin State Assembly from the district comprising northeastern Fond du Lac County.  He served in the 1855, 1860, 1862, and 1870 sessions.  In addition, he was a member of the Fond du Lac County Board of Supervisors for nine years between 1854 and 1866, and was chairman for 1857 and 1861.

After visiting his brothers-in-law in Kansas in 1871, he moved to Montgomery County, Kansas, with his wife and son, George.

He was elected to the Kansas House of Representatives in 1873, with an apparent margin of victory of just four votes.  His Republican opponent, C. S. Brown challenged the results of the election in the Kansas House Committee on Elections, alleging he had identified at least four illegal votes for Boyd.  The House ultimately voted to grant the seat to Brown in February 1874, by a narrow vote.  He remained involved in Kansas politics and served as an officer of the state Grange and was active in the Greenback movement in the latter half of the 1870s.

His health began to decline about 1880 and he returned to Wisconsin, hoping the environment would improve his health.  After a year in Wisconsin, he returned to Kansas, feeling restored.  Two months later, he began to fail again until finally, in June 1882, he decided to take another trip to Wisconsin.  He died at Fond du Lac, Wisconsin, on July 2, 1882.

Personal life and family
John Boyd was a son of Thomas Boyd (1785–1862) and his wife Ann.  Thomas Boyd was an Irishman who served in the British Army, he brought the family to America and purchased land in Calumet and Fond du Lac.  John Boyd had several brothers and sisters, many of his brothers also became notable in early Wisconsin—Thomas Boyd served in the State Assembly, Samuel Boyd became a county judge, and Adam Boyd was a prominent real estate dealer and businessman in Fond du Lac.

References

1824 births
1882 deaths
19th-century English people
Alumni of Trinity College Dublin
People from Calumet, Wisconsin
People from Montgomery County, Kansas
Democratic Party members of the Wisconsin State Assembly
Members of the Kansas House of Representatives
Kansas Greenbacks
Irish emigrants to the United States (before 1923)